Hsu Pei-Chin (born 24 October 1973) is a Taiwanese hurdler. She competed in the women's 400 metres hurdles at the 1996 Summer Olympics.

References

1973 births
Living people
Athletes (track and field) at the 1996 Summer Olympics
Taiwanese female hurdlers
Olympic athletes of Taiwan
Place of birth missing (living people)
Asian Games medalists in athletics (track and field)
Asian Games silver medalists for Chinese Taipei
Athletes (track and field) at the 1994 Asian Games
Athletes (track and field) at the 1998 Asian Games
Medalists at the 1994 Asian Games
Medalists at the 1998 Asian Games